Alma is a Brussels Metro station on line 1. It is located in the municipality of Woluwe-Saint-Lambert/Sint-Lambrechts-Woluwe, in the eastern part of Brussels, Belgium, serving the Brussels-Woluwe campus of the University of Louvain (UCLouvain), and was opened on 7 May 1982. Designed by Lucien Kroll as a total artwork, it takes its name from its location on the /, the university campus' main square.

The original eastern terminus of the former line 1B was at Tomberg, prior to the opening of the extension to Alma. Alma station then served as the terminus until 1988, when the line was further extended to Stockel/Stokkel.

References

External links

Brussels metro stations
Railway stations opened in 1982
Woluwe-Saint-Lambert
1982 establishments in Belgium